Snowville Historic District is a national historic district located at Snowville, Pulaski County, Virginia. It encompasses 44 contributing buildings in the village of Snowville.  It includes a variety of residential, commercial, and industrial buildings dated as early as the 1850s.  Notable buildings include the Snowville Milling Complex (1856-1857), Elmore House, Snow-Bullard House, "Humility," Snowville school (1880s), Masonic temple (1865), Reese Blacksmith Shop, and the store and village post office.  Located in the district is the separately listed Snowville Christian Church.

It was added to the National Register of Historic Places in 1987.

References

Historic districts in Pulaski County, Virginia
Greek Revival architecture in Virginia
National Register of Historic Places in Pulaski County, Virginia
Historic districts on the National Register of Historic Places in Virginia
Blacksmith shops